
Year 513 (DXIII) was a common year starting on Tuesday (link will display the full calendar) of the Julian calendar. At the time, it was known as the Year of the Consulship of Probus and Clementinus (or, less frequently, year 1266 Ab urbe condita). The denomination 513 for this year has been used since the early medieval period, when the Anno Domini calendar era became the prevalent method in Europe for naming years.

Events 
 By place 

 Europe 
 Revolt of Vitalian: Byzantine general Vitalian revolts against Emperor Anastasius I, and conquers a large part of the Diocese of Thrace. He gains the support of the local people, and assembles an army of 50,000–60,000 men.
 Anastasius I reduces taxes in the provinces of Bithynia and Asia, to prevent them from joining the rebellion. Vitalian marches to Constantinople and encamps at the suburb of Hebdomon (modern Turkey). 
 Anastasius I sends an embassy under the former consul Patricius to start negotiations. Vitalian declares his aims: restoration of Chalcedonian Orthodoxy and the settling of the Thracian foederati.
 Vitalian accepts an agreement and returns with his army to Lower Moesia. After a few inconclusive skirmishes, Anastasius I sends a Byzantine army (80,000 men) under his nephew Hypatius. 
 Vitalian defeats the Byzantines at Acris (Bulgaria), on the Black Sea coast. He attacks their fortified Laager in darkness, and in a crushing defeat kills a large part of the imperial army.

 Persia 
 King Kavadh I adopts the doctrine of the Mazdakites, and breaks the influence of the magnates' (nobility).
 The Jewish community revolts at Ctesiphon against Mazdakism, and establishes an independent Jewish kingdom that lasts for seven years.

 By topic 

 Religion 
 Vigor becomes bishop of Bayeux. He opposes paganism and founds a monastery later known as Saint-Vigor-le-Grand (Normandy).

Births 
 An Ding Wang, emperor of Northern Wei (d. 532)

Deaths 
 Gesalec, king of the Visigoths (approximate date)
 Shen Yue, Chinese historian and statesman (b. 441)

References 

Bibliography